Tanzania competed in the 2003 All-Africa Games held at the National Stadium in the city of Abuja, Nigeria.

Medal summary
Tanzania won 2 medals, a gold and a bronze. This was the first time that the country had won a gold medal in the games since 1965.

Medal table

List of Medalists

Gold Medal

Bronze Medal

See also
 Tanzania at the African Games

References

2003 in Tanzanian sport
 Nations at the 2003 All-Africa Games
2003